Brian Reid may refer to:

Brian Reid (computer scientist) (born 1949), computer scientist
Brian Reid (historian), Canadian military historian
Brian Reid (footballer) (born 1970), former Scottish footballer and current manager
Brian Reid (motorcyclist), Irish motorcycle racer
Brian Reid (entrepreneur) (born 1972)

See also
Brian Read (born 1939), cricketer
Brian Reade (born 1957), British writer and radio presenter
Bryan Reid, musician in Truthhorse